The Congolian rainforests are a broad belt of lowland tropical moist broadleaf forests which extend across the basin of the Congo River and its tributaries in Central Africa. They are the only major rainforests which absorb more carbon than they emit.

Description

The Congolian rainforest is the world's second-largest tropical forest, after the Amazon rainforest. The Congolian forests cover southeastern Cameroon, Gabon, Republic of the Congo, the northern and central Democratic Republic of the Congo, and portions of southern and central Africa. The Congolian rainforest is home to a large number of flora and fauna, including more than 10,000 species of plants and over 10,000 species of animals. It is estimated that the region contains more than a quarter of the world’s plant species and is home to one of the world’s most threatened primate species, the western lowland gorilla.[4] There are also a number of other species of primates, including the chimpanzee, black colobus monkey, red colobus monkey, and olive baboon.

To the north, south, and southwest, the forests transition to drier forest-savanna mosaic, a mosaic of drier forests, savannas, and grasslands. To the west, the Congolian forests transition to the coastal Lower Guinean forests, which extend from southwestern Cameroon into southern Nigeria and Benin; these forest zones share many similarities and are sometimes known as the Lower Guinean-Congolian forests. To the east, the lowland Congolian forests transition to the highland Albertine Rift montane forests, which cover the mountains lining the Albertine Rift, a branch of the East African Rift system.

Ecoregions 
The World Wide Fund for Nature divides the Congolian forests into six distinct ecoregions:

 Atlantic Equatorial coastal forests (Cameroon, Equatorial Guinea, Gabon, Republic of the Congo, Angola, Democratic Republic of the Congo)
 Northwestern Congolian lowland forests (Cameroon, Central African Republic, Gabon, Republic of  Congo)
 Western Congolian swamp forests (Republic of the Congo, Democratic Republic of the Congo)
 Eastern Congolian swamp forests (Democratic Republic of the Congo)
 Central Congolian lowland forests (Democratic Republic of the Congo)
Northeastern Congolian lowland forests (Democratic Republic of the Congo, Central African Republic)

Flora and fauna

The Congolian rainforests are home to over 10,000 species of plants of which 30% are endemic. The Congolian rainforests are less biodiverse than the Amazon and Southeast Asian rainforests. However, its plant and animal life is still more rich and varied than most other places on Earth. The Congolian Forests are a global 200 ecoregion.

There are over 400 species of mammals in the rainforest, including African forest elephants, African bush elephants, chimpanzees, bonobos, mountain gorillas, and lowland gorillas. The okapi is endemic to the northeastern Congolian rainforests.

The rainforests have 1,000 native species of birds, and 700 species of fish.

Conservation

Threats to the rainforests include destruction and fragmentation of forests by commercial logging, oil palm plantations, and mining. The bushmeat trade and poaching is depleting the rainforests of wildlife. With annual forest loss of 0.3% during the 2000s, the region has the lowest deforestation rate of any major tropical forest zone.

References

External links
 https://web.archive.org/web/20120308120322/http://www.whrc.org/mapping/pantropical/carbonmap2000.html
 Congo Basin Ecoregions, Yale School of Forestry and Environmental Studies
 The Congo Rainforest
 Congo Rainforest and Basin (WWF)

Afrotropical ecoregions
Rainforests of Africa
Congolian forests
Ecoregions of Cameroon
Ecoregions of Gabon
Ecoregions of the Central African Republic
Ecoregions of the Democratic Republic of the Congo
Ecoregions of the Republic of the Congo